Passerea  is a clade of neoavian birds that was proposed by Jarvis et al. (2014). Their genomic analysis recovered two major clades within Neoaves, Passerea and Columbea, and concluded that both clades appear to have many ecologically driven convergent traits.

According to Jarvis (2014), these convergences include the foot-propelled diving trait of grebes in Columbea with loons and cormorants in Passerea; the wading-feeding trait of flamingos in Columbea with ibises and egrets in Passerea; and pigeons and sandgrouse in Columbea with shorebirds (killdeer) in Passerea. For Jarvis (2014), these long-known trait and morphological alliances suggest that some of the traditional nongenomic trait classifications are based on polyphyletic assemblages.

Passerea was not recovered in other studies.

Phylogeny

Cladogram of Passerea relationships based on Jarvis, E.D. et al. (2014) with some clade names after Yuri, T. et al. (2013) and Kimball et al. 2013.

The following cladogram illustrates the proposed relationships between bird clades of Passerea. This consensus phylogeny of birds is based on phylogenomic data, reflecting a recent phylogenomic supertree analysis and modified after two recent more recent phylogenomic studies.

References

Bird taxonomy